Salado, also known as Salido, is a populated place situated in Apache County, Arizona, United States.

Its current mayor is Taylor Lee.

References

Populated places in Apache County, Arizona